The South African type ZE tender was a steam locomotive tender.

Type ZE tenders were rebuilt from Type ZC tenders which had entered service between 1896 and 1902. The rebuilding resulted in a tender with a larger water tank and larger coal bunker.

Origin
The original 7th Class locomotive and tender were designed in 1892 at the Salt River works in Cape Town, under the supervision of H.M. Beatty, the Cape Government Railways (CGR) Western System's Locomotive Superintendent at the time.

Type ZC tenders entered service as tenders to six 7th Class locomotive variants between 1896 and 1913, built by Dübs and Company, Kitson and Company, Neilson and Company, Neilson, Reid and Company, North British Locomotive Company and Sharp, Stewart and Company.

Rebuilding
From c. 1925, several of the Type ZC tenders which had entered service with the Class 7A in 1896, the Class 7B in 1900 and the Class 7C in 1902, were completely rebuilt by the South African Railways (SAR), by mounting a new upper structure on the existing underframe, with larger water tanks and a larger coal capacity. These rebuilt tenders had a more modern appearance, with flush sides all the way to the top of the coal bunker. They were designated Type ZE.

The program to rebuild several older tender types with new upper structures was begun by Col F.R. Collins DSO, who approved several of the detailed drawings for the work during his term in office as Chief Mechanical Engineer (CME) of the SAR from 1922 to 1929. It was continued by his successor, A.G. Watson, CME from 1929 to 1936.

Characteristics

Classification letters
Since many tender types are interchangeable between different locomotive classes and types, a tender classification system was adopted by the SAR. The first letter of the tender type indicates the classes of engines to which it could be coupled. The "Z_" tenders could be used with the locomotive classes as shown.
 CGR 7th Class of 1892, SAR Class 7.
 CGR 7th Class of 1896, SAR Class 7A.
 Imperial Military Railways 7th Class, SAR Class 7B.
 CGR 7th Class of 1902, SAR Class 7C.
 Rhodesia Railways 7th Class, SAR Class 7D.
 New Cape Central Railway 7th Class of 1899, SAR Class 7E.
 New Cape Central Railway 7th Class of 1913, SAR Class 7F.

The second letter indicates the tender's water capacity.

Illustration

References

ZE